Dirgantara Air Service was an airline based in Jakarta, Indonesia. It operated scheduled domestic services, as well as charters and aerial work. Its main bases were Halim Perdanakusuma International Airport, Jakarta, Samarinda Airport, Syamsudin Noor Airport, Banjarmasin and  Supadio Airport, Pontianak. Dirgantara Air Service is not listed in any category by Indonesian Civil Aviation Authority for airline safety quality.

Since 2008, Dirgantara Air Service operation licence is revoked and on March 5, 2013 Central Jakarta Commercial Court declared the company in Bankruptcy.

History 
The airline was established and started operations in 1971. It was owned by UDI Upaya Foundation (40%), its employees (30%) and others (40%). At March 2007, it had 232 employees.

In March 2007 Dirgantara Air Service was rated as "holding potential for threatening safety of aviation" by a survey of the Indonesian Transport Ministry, forcing the airline to ground three of its aircraft. Other reports state that Dirgantara Air Service has been grounded.

In 2009, Dirgantara Air Service was discontinued.

Destinations 

Dirgantara Air Service operated scheduled services to the following domestic destinations in January 2005: Balikpapan, Banjarmasin, Berau, Datadawai, Ketapang, Long Apung, Long Bawan, Nunukan, Pangkalan Bun, Pontianak, Putussibau, Samarinda (Temindung Airport[Hub]), Sampit, Sintang, Tanjung, Tanjung Selor and Tarakan.

Fleet 
Upon closure, the Dirgantara Air Service fleet included the following aircraft:

2 ATR 42-300

Further aircraft included: 
6 Britten-Norman BN2A Islander
2 Indonesian Aerospace 212-100
6 Indonesian Aerospace 212-200

Accidents and incidents 
 On 7 December 1996, a CASA 212 registered as PK-VSO crashed into residential area shortly after take off from Banjarmasin Airport in South Kalimantan. 18 people, including 2 bystanders, were killed in the crash.
 On 18 November 2000, a Britten Norman BN2A Islander, registered as PK-VIY, operating as Dirgantara Air Service Flight 3130, crashes into the forest shortly after take off from Datah Dawai Airport, East Kalimantan. No one was killed in the accident, but all 18 people on board were injured, 11 of them were seriously injured. Multiple issues on the airport, crews, and security causes the crash.
 On 26 February 2008, a CASA 212-200 with a registration code of PK-VSE went missing over the jungle of Borneo while conducting a chartered cargo flight from Tarakan Airport, Tarakan to Long Apung Airport. The plane was carrying 3 people. Search and rescue team found the wreckage of the plane in the following hours. All on board were killed. Before it went missing, the plane sent a distress signal to nearby aircraft. The crash was categorized as CFIT.

References

Defunct airlines of Indonesia
Airlines established in 1971
Airlines disestablished in 2009
Indonesian companies established in 1971
2009 disestablishments in Indonesia